Cruz de amor, is a Mexican telenovela produced by Televisa and originally transmitted by Telesistema Mexicano.

Cast 
 Silvia Derbez as Cruz Aguirre
 Jorge Lavat as Marcos de los Monteros
 Lupita Lara as Marisol Aguirre / Claudia
 María Teresa Rivas as Doña Delfina de los Monteros
 Alicia Rodríguez as Inés de los Monteros
 José Roberto Hill as Ismael Aguirre
 Daniel "El Chino" Herrera as Tito
 Andrea López as Doña Antonia Lorenzo
 Olivia Michel
 Armando Arriola
 Tara Parra as Maura "La Mina"
 Arcadio Gamboa
 Roberto González
 Jorge Castillo

References

External links 

Mexican telenovelas
Televisa telenovelas
Spanish-language telenovelas
1968 telenovelas
1968 Mexican television series debuts
1968 Mexican television series endings